The Men's road race of the 2019 UCI Road World Championships was a cycling event that took place on 29 September 2019 in Yorkshire, England. The wet weather also meant there was a limited broadcast coverage of the race.

For the first time in the race's history, a Danish rider won the world title as Mads Pedersen out-sprinted two other riders at the finish in Harrogate to take the rainbow jersey. The silver medal went to Italy's Matteo Trentin, while the bronze medal went to Stefan Küng of Switzerland.

Qualification
Qualification was based mainly on the UCI World Ranking by nations as of 11 August 2019.

UCI World Rankings
The following nations qualified.

Continental champions

Participating nations
197 cyclists from 42 nations were entered in the men's road race. The number of cyclists per nation is shown in parentheses.

Results

Final classification

Failed to finish
149 riders failed to finish, while South Africa's Jay Thomson and Ukraine's Mark Padun failed to start.

References

External links
Men's road race page at the Yorkshire 2019 website

Men's road race
UCI Road World Championships – Men's road race
2019 in men's road cycling